Catherine Kellner (born October 2, 1970) is an American character actress, perhaps best known for appearing in Daft Punk's music-video for their song Da Funk.

Early life and education 
Kellner was born in Manhattan, New York. Her mother was a psychologist and her father was a Greek classics scholar who immigrated to the United States from Hungary. She attended Vassar College, then New York University's Graduate Acting Program at the Tisch School of the Arts, graduating in 1995.

Personal life 
Kellner lives in New York City and is married to Reuben Avery, a photographer and computer programmer, and has one son. Her parents are George and Martha Kellner, who, in May 1970, survived the crash of ALM Flight 980 in the Caribbean. Martha Kellner was pregnant with Catherine at the time.

Filmography

Film

Television

References

External links

1970 births
Actresses from New York City
American film actresses
American television actresses
Living people
People from Manhattan
Tisch School of the Arts alumni
Vassar College alumni